David Yair Keltjens (or Klatins, ; born 11 June 1995) is an Israeli professional footballer who plays as a defensive midfielder or as a defender for Israeli Premier League club Hapoel Tel Aviv and the Israel national team.

Early and personal life
Keltjens was born in Mevaseret Zion, Israel; to his father Yossi Keltjens who is of Dutch origin; and to his mother Flori ( Ben-Harush) who is of both Sephardi Jewish and Mizrahi Jewish (Moroccan-Jewish) descent and hails from the neighborhood of Katamon in Jerusalem, Israel. He has a sister named Emily, and a brother named Michael. His late maternal grandfather was also a footballer in Morocco. He was enlisted and served in the Israel Defense Forces.

He also holds a Dutch passport, which eases the move to certain European football leagues.

He has been in a relationship with his Israeli girlfriend Yael Alexandra Gold since 2021.

Club career

Beitar Jerusalem
From age 6 to 8, Keltjens was part of the Hapoel Tel Aviv Youth Academy. At the age of 12, he joined the Beitar Jerusalem youth system, where he eventually also made his senior debut for the senior club of Beitar Jerusalem in an Israeli Premier League away match against Maccabi Tel Aviv, which ended in a 2–4 victory for his team; on 26 October 2015.

Hapoel Be'er Sheva
On 25 June 2019, he signed with Israeli Premier League club Hapoel Be'er Sheva for five years.

International career
On 6 November 2016, Keltjens was first called up to the senior Israel national team, ahead of their match against Albania. On 24 March 2017, he made his senior international debut, coming on as a 60th minute substitute against Spain in a 2018 FIFA World Cup qualification (UEFA) away match that ended in a 2–4 defeat for his native Israel.

Honours

Club 
Hapoel Be'er Sheva
State Cup: 2019–20, 2021–22
Super Cup: 2022

See also
List of Jewish footballers
List of Jews in sports
List of Israelis

References 

1995 births
Living people
Israeli footballers
Jewish footballers
People from Mevaseret Zion
Footballers from Jerusalem District
Beitar Jerusalem F.C. players
Hapoel Be'er Sheva F.C. players
Hapoel Tel Aviv F.C. players
Israeli Premier League players
Association football midfielders
Israel under-21 international footballers
Israeli people of Dutch-Jewish descent
Israeli people of Moroccan-Jewish descent
Israeli Sephardi Jews
Israeli Mizrahi Jews